Jinjang, also known as J-Town, is a township and Chinese new village in the Kepong constituency in north-western Kuala Lumpur, Malaysia.

Jinjang comprises Jinjang Utara (North) and Jinjang Selatan (South). It was previously known for the prevalence of 'gangsterism' from the 1960s.

Etymology of the name
It has been believed that the name Jinjang was derived from the name of a pig brought to Malaya by a Chinese merchant in the 19th century. The pig was believed to be auspicious.

The name Jinjang might also be derived from the mispronunciation of the Chinese word “Zeng Guang”.

History
The town in its modern form was established as part of the British strategy called the Briggs Plan during the Malayan Emergency. The strategy aimed to relocate the colony’s large rural ethnic Chinese population of Malaya into more concentrated and governable spaces; in an effort to cut off supplies – mainly food, money and military provisions – to the MCP and MNLA. Jinjang was by far the largest of the resettlement areas (called "New Villages") on the outskirts of Kuala Lumpur, with an approximate population of 13,000, and at 445 hectares (4.45 km2), nearly twice the size of the other New Villages combined.

During early post-independence years until the 1960s, the town gained a "fearsome" reputation due to the presence of bandit members; the notorious "Robin Hood" criminal Botak Chin was said to have been active in the area. Older residents surmised that the area's alleged seedy reputation likely stemmed from the fact that most early inhabitants were working-class and thus viewed with prejudice.

Along with the township of Kepong, Jinjang has been particularly prone to outbreaks of dengue fever, and the outbreak of the 1973 dengue epidemic which resulted in 969 reported cases and killed 54 people was traced to Jinjang.

Transportation
It is served by Jinjang MRT station and Sri Delima MRT station - on the MRT Putrajaya Line, with operations began on 16 June 2022.

See also
 New Village

References

Suburbs in Kuala Lumpur